Jacob William Dill (September 3, 1840 – September 23, 1920) was an Ontario merchant and political figure. He represented Muskoka and Parry Sound in the Legislative Assembly of Ontario as a Liberal member from 1884 to 1886.

He was born in Preston, Waterloo County, Ontario in 1840. He worked for Jacob Hespeler in Preston before moving to Pembroke where he worked for a firm of general merchants. In 1868, he married Mary Annie Wright. Dill later moved to Bracebridge where he went into business for himself. He served on the village council and was reeve from 1878 to 1879 and from 1882 to 1883. In 1882, he served as warden for Victoria County. Dill was elected to the Ontario assembly after Frederick G. Fauquier was disqualified in 1884. He was treasurer for the Muskoka District Agricultural Society and was also secretary for the Muskoka lodge of the Freemasons. He died of heart failure aboard a westbound train near Vernon, British Columbia.

References

Notes

Citations

External links

The Canadian parliamentary companion, 1885 JA Gemmill
A Cyclopæedia of Canadian biography : being chiefly men of the time ... GM Rose (1886)

1840 births
1920 deaths
Ontario Liberal Party MPPs
People from Pembroke, Ontario